A sari (sometimes also saree or shari) is a women's garment from the Indian subcontinent, that consists of an un-stitched stretch of woven fabric arranged over the body as a robe, with one end tied to the waist, while the other end rests over one shoulder as a stole (shawl),  sometimes baring a part of the midriff. There are various names and styles of sari manufacture and draping, the most common being the Nivi style. It remains fashionable in the Indian Subcontinent today.

Etymology 
The word  is mentioned as describing women's dharmic attire in Sanskrit literature and Buddhist literature called Jatakas. This could be equivalent to the modern day sari. The term for female bodice, the  evolved from ancient . Rajatarangini, a tenth-century literary work by Kalhana, states that the choli from the Deccan was introduced under the royal order in Kashmir.

Apart from the standard "petticoat", it may also be called "inner skirt" or an inskirt.

Origins and history

History of Sari-like drapery is traced back to the Indus Valley civilisation, which flourished during 2800–1800 BCE around the northwestern part of the Indian subcontinent. Cotton was first cultivated and woven on the Indian subcontinent around the 5th millennium BCE. Dyes used during this period are still in use, particularly indigo, lac, red madder and turmeric. Silk was woven around 2450 BCE and 2000 BCE.

The word sari evolved from  mentioned in earliest Hindu literature as women's attire. This ensemble is mentioned in Sanskrit literature and Buddhist Pali literature during the 6th century BCE. Ancient antariya closely resembled the dhoti wrap in the "fishtail" version which was passed through the legs, covered the legs loosely and then flowed into long, decorative pleats at front of the legs. It further evolved into Bhairnivasani skirt, today known as ghagri and lehenga. Uttariya was a shawl-like veil worn over the shoulder or head. It evolved into what is known today known as dupatta and ghoonghat. Likewise, the  evolved into the choli by the 1st century CE.

The ancient Sanskrit work Kadambari by Banabhatta and ancient Tamil poetry, such as the Silappadhikaram, describes women in exquisite drapery or sari. In ancient India, although women wore saris that bared the midriff, the Dharmasastra writers stated that women should be dressed such that the navel would never become visible, which may have led to a taboo on navel exposure at some times and places.

It is generally accepted that wrapped sari-like garments for lower body and sometimes shawls or scarf like garment called 'uttariya' for upper body, have been worn by Indian women for a long time, and that they have been worn in their current form for hundreds of years. In ancient couture the lower garment was called 'nivi' or 'nivi bandha', while the upper body was mostly left bare.

Poetic references from works like Silappadikaram indicate that during the Sangam period in ancient Tamil Nadu in southern India, a single piece of clothing served as both lower garment and head covering, leaving the midriff completely uncovered. Similar styles of the sari are recorded paintings by Raja Ravi Varma in Kerala. The two-piece Kerala mundum neryathum (mundu, a dhoti or sarong, neryath, a shawl, in Malayalam) is a survival of ancient clothing styles. The one-piece sari in Kerala is derived from neighbouring Tamil Nadu or Deccan during medieval period based on its appearance on various temple murals in medieval Kerala.

Early Sanskrit literature has a wide vocabulary of terms for the veiling used by women, such as Avagunthana (oguntheti/oguṇthikā), meaning cloak-veil, Uttariya meaning shoulder-veil, Mukha-pata meaning face-veil and Sirovas-tra meaning head-veil. In the Pratimānātaka, a play by Bhāsa describes in context of Avagunthana veil that "ladies may be seen without any blame (for the parties concerned) in a religious session, in marriage festivities, during a calamity and in a forest". The same sentiment is more generically expressed in later Sanskrit literature. Śūdraka, the author of Mṛcchakatika set in fifth century BCE says that the Avagaunthaha was not used by women everyday and at every time. He says that a married lady was expected to put on a veil while moving in the public. This may indicate that it was not necessary for unmarried females to put on a veil. This form of veiling by married women is still prevalent in Hindi-speaking areas, and is known as ghoonghat where the loose end of a sari is pulled over the head to act as a facial veil.

Based on sculptures and paintings, tight bodices or cholis are believed to have evolved between the 2nd century BCE to 6th century CE in various regional styles. Early cholis were front covering tied at the back; this style was more common in parts of ancient northern India. This ancient form of bodice or choli are still common in the state of Rajasthan today. Varies styles of decorative traditional embroidery like gota patti, mochi, pakko, kharak, suf, kathi, phulkari and gamthi are done on cholis. In Southern parts of India, choli is known as ravikie which is tied at the front instead of back, kasuti is traditional form of embroidery used for cholis in this region. In Nepal, choli is known as cholo or chaubandi cholo and is traditionally tied at the front.

Red is the most favoured colour for wedding saris, which are the traditional garment choice for brides in Hindu wedding. Women traditionally wore various types of regional handloom saris made of silk, cotton, ikkat, block-print, embroidery and tie-dye textiles. Most sought after brocade silk saris are Banasari, Kanchipuram, Gadwal, Paithani, Mysore, Uppada, Bagalpuri, Balchuri, Maheshwari, Chanderi, Mekhela, Ghicha, Narayan pet and Eri etc. are traditionally worn for festive and formal occasions. Silk Ikat and cotton saris known as Patola, Pochampally, Bomkai, Khandua, Sambalpuri, Gadwal, Berhampuri, Bargarh, Jamdani, Tant, Mangalagiri, Guntur, Narayan pet, Chanderi, Maheshwari, Nuapatn, Tussar, Ilkal, Kotpad and Manipuri were worn for both festive and everyday attire. Tie-dyed and block-print saris known as Bandhani, Leheria/Leheriya, Bagru, Ajrakh, Sungudi, Kota Dabu/Dabu print, Bagh and Kalamkari were traditionally worn during monsoon season. Gota Patti is popular form of traditional embroidery used on saris for formal occasions, various other types of traditional folk embroidery such mochi, pakko, kharak, suf, kathi, phulkari and gamthi are also commonly used for both informal and formal occasion. Today, modern fabrics like polyester, georgette and charmeuse are also commonly used.

Styles of draping

There are more than 80 recorded ways to wear a sari. The most common style is for the sari to be wrapped around the waist, with the loose end of the drape to be worn over the shoulder, baring the midriff. However, the sari can be draped in several different styles, though some styles do require a sari of a particular length or form. Ṛta Kapur Chishti, a sari historian and recognised textile scholar, has documented 108 ways of wearing a sari in her book, 'Saris: Tradition and Beyond'. The book documents the sari drapes across fourteen states of Gujarat, Maharashtra, Goa, Karnataka, Kerala, Tamil Nadu, Andhra Pradesh, Odisha, West Bengal, Jharkhand, Bihar, Chhattisgarh, Madhya Pradesh, and Uttar Pradesh. The French cultural anthropologist and sari researcher Chantal Boulanger categorised sari drapes in the following families:

The Sari Series, a non-profit project created in 2017 is a digital anthology documenting India's regional sari drapes providing over 80 short films on how-to-drape the various styles. 
 Nivi sari – style originally worn in Deccan region; besides the modern nivi, there is also the Nauvari, kaccha or kasta nivi, where the pleats are passed through the legs and tucked into at the back. This allows free movement while covering the legs.
 Bihar, Uttar Pradesh, Gujarati, Rajasthani – It is worn similar to nivi style but with loose end of sari aanchal or pallu placed in the front, therefore this style is known as sidha anchal or sidha pallu. After tucking in the pleats similar to the nivi style, the loose end is taken from the back, draped across the right shoulder, and pulled across to be secured in the back. This style is also worn by Punjabi and Sindhi Hindus. 
 Bengali and Odia style is worn with single box-pleat. Traditionally the Bengali style is worn with single box pleat where the sari is wrapped around in an anti-clockwise direction around the waist and then a second time from the other direction. The loose end is a lot longer and that goes around the body over the left shoulder. There is enough cloth left to cover the head as well. 
 Himalayan - Kulluvi Pattu is traditional form of woolen sari worn in Himachal Pradesh, similar variation is also worn in Uttarakhand.
 Nepali: Nepal has many different varieties of draping sari, today the most common is the Nivi drape.  The traditional Newari sari drape is, folding the sari till it is below knee length and then wearing it like a nivi sari but the pallu is not worn across the chest and instead is tied around the waist and leaving it so it drops from waist to the knee, instead the pallu or a shawl is tied across the chest, by wrapping it from the right hip and back and is thrown over the shoulders. Saris are worn with blouse that are thicker and are tied several times across the front. The Bhojpuri and Awadhi speaking community wears the sari sedha pallu like the Gujrati drape. The Mithila community has its own traditional Maithili drapes like the madhubani and purniea drapes but today those are rare and most sari is worn with the pallu in the front or the nivi style. The women of the Rajbanshi communities traditionally wear their sari with no choli and tied below the neck like a towel but today only old women wear it in that style and the nivi and the Bengali drapes are more popular today. The Nivi drape was popularized in Nepal by the Shah royals and the Ranas.
 Nauvari and Kasta: this drape is worn similar to ancient form of navi sari worn in "Kacche" style where pleats in the front are tucked in the back, though there are many regional and societal variations. The style worn by Brahmin women differs from that of the Marathas. The style also differs from community to community. This style is popular in Maharashtra and Goa. 
 Madisar – this drape is typical of Iyengar/Iyer Brahmin ladies from Tamil Nadu. Traditional Madisar is worn using 9 yards sari. The Parsi ‘gara’ is a quintessence of embroidery, art and history, and it has a Chinese link
 Pin Kosuvam - this is the traditional Tamil Nadu style
 The Brahmika sari was introduced to Bengal by Jnanadanandini Devi after her tour in Bombay in 1870.  Jnanadanandini improvised upon the sari style worn by Parsi and Gujarati women, which came to be known as Brahmika style.
 Kodagu style – this drape is confined to ladies hailing from the Kodagu district of Karnataka. In this style, the pleats are created in the rear, instead of the front. The loose end of the sari is draped back-to-front over the right shoulder, and is pinned to the rest of the sari.
 Gobbe Seere – This style is worn by women in the Malnad or Sahyadri and central region of Karnataka. It is worn with 18 molas sari with three-four rounds at the waist and a knot after crisscrossing over shoulders.
 Karnataka – In Karnataka, apart from traditional Nivi sari, sari is also worn in "Karnataka Kacche" drape, kacche drape which shows nivi drape in front and kacche in back, there are Four kacche styles known in Karnataka - "Hora kacche", "Melgacche" ,"Vala kacche" or "Olagacche" and " Hale Kacche".
 Kerala sari style – the two-piece sari, or Mundum Neryathum, worn in Kerala. Usually made of unbleached cotton and decorated with gold or coloured stripes and/or borders. Also the Kerala sari, a sort of mundum neryathum.
 Kunbi style or denthli: Goan Kunbis and Gauda, and those of them who have migrated to other states use this way of draping sari or kappad, this form of draping is created by tying a knot in the fabric below the shoulder and a strip of cloth which crossed the left shoulder was fasten on the back.
 Riha-Mekhela, Kokalmora, Chador/Murot Mora Gamusa - This style worn in Assam is a wrap around style cloth similar to other wrap-around from other parts of South-East Asia and is actually very different in origin from the Mainland Indian sari. It is originally a four-set of separate garments (quite dissimilar to the sari as it is a single cloth) known Riha-Mekhela, Kokalmora, Chador/Murot Mora Gamusa. The bottom portion, draped from the waist downwards is called Mekhela. The Riha or Methoni is wrapped and often secured by tying them firmly across the chest, covering the breasts originally but now it is sometimes replaced by the influence of immigrant Mainland Indian styles which is traditionally incorrect. The Kokalmora was used originally to tie the Mekhela around the waist and keep it firm. 
 Innaphi and Phanek - This style of clothing worn in Manipur is also worn with three-set garment known as Innaphi Viel, Phanek lower wrap and long sleeved choli. It is somewhat similar to the style of clothing worn in Assam.
 Jainsem - It is a Khasi style of clothing worn in Khasi which is made up of several pieces of cloth, giving the body a cylindrical shape.

Historic photographs and regional styles

Nivi style

The Nivi in most common style of sari worn today, which originated in Deccan region. In the Deccan region the Nivi existed in two styles, a style similar to modern Nivi and the second style worn with front pleats of Nivi tucked in the back.

The increased interactions during colonial era saw most women from royal families come out of purdah in the 1900s. This necessitated a change of dress. Maharani Indira Devi of Cooch Behar popularised the chiffon sari. She was widowed early in life and followed the convention of abandoning her richly woven Baroda shalus in favour of the unadorned mourning white as per tradition. Characteristically, she transformed her "mourning" clothes into high fashion. She had saris woven in France to her personal specifications, in white chiffon, and introduced the silk chiffon sari to the royal fashion repertoire.

Under colonial rule, petticoat was adopted, along with Victorian styles of puffed-sleeved blouses, which was commonly seen among the elites in Bombay presidency and Bengal presidency. Nivi drape starts with one end of the sari tucked into the waistband of the petticoat, usually a plain skirt. The cloth is wrapped around the lower body once, then hand-gathered into even pleats below the navel. The pleats are tucked into the waistband of the petticoat. They create a graceful, decorative effect which poets have likened to the petals of a flower. After one more turn around the waist, the loose end is draped over the shoulder. The loose end is called the aanchal, pallu, pallav, seragu, or paita depending on the language. It is draped diagonally in front of the torso. It is worn across the right hip to over the left shoulder, partly baring the midriff. The navel can be revealed or concealed by the wearer by adjusting the pallu, depending on the social setting. The long end of the pallu hanging from the back of the shoulder is often intricately decorated. The pallu may be hanging freely, tucked in at the waist, used to cover the head, or used to cover the neck, by draping it across the right shoulder as well. Some Nivi styles are worn with the pallu draped from the back towards the front, coming from the back over the right shoulder with one corner tucked by the left hip, covering the torso/waist. The Nivi sari was popularised through the paintings of Raja Ravi Varma. In one of his paintings, the Indian subcontinent was shown as a mother wearing a flowing Nivi sari. The ornaments sometimes worn in the midriff region on top of a sari are waist chains. They are sometimes worn as a part of bridal jewellery.

Professional style of draping

Because of the harsh extremes in temperature on the Indian subcontinent, the sari fills a practical role as well as a decorative one. It is not only warming in winter and cooling in summer, but its loose-fitting tailoring is preferred by women who must be free to move as their duties require. For this reason, it is the uniform of Biman Bangladesh Airlines and Air India uniform for air hostesses. An air hostess-style sari is draped in similar manner to a traditional sari, but most of the pleats are pinned to keep them in place. Bangladeshi female newsreaders and anchors also drape their sari in this particular style.

Saris are worn as uniforms by the female hotel staff of many five-star luxury hotels in India, Sri Lanka, and Bangladesh as the symbol of Indian, Sri Lankan, and Bangladeshi culture, respectively. 

Similarly, the female politicians of all three countries wear the sari in a professional manner. Bangladeshi politicians usually wear saris with long sleeve blouse while covering their midriff. Some politicians pair up saris with hijabs or shawls for more coverage.

The women of the Nehru–Gandhi family like Indira Gandhi and Sonia Gandhi have worn a special blouse for the campaign trail which is longer than usual and is tucked in to prevent any midriff showing while waving to the crowds. Stylist Prasad Bidapa has to say, "I think Sonia Gandhi is the country's most stylish politician. But that's because she's inherited the best collection of saris from her mother-in-law. I'm also happy that she supports the Indian handloom industry with her selection."

Most female MPs in the Sri Lankan Parliament wear a Kandyan osari. This includes prominent women in politics, the first female premier in the world, Sirimavo Bandaranaike and President Chandrika Bandaranaike Kumaratunga. Contemporary examples include Pavithra Wanniarachchi, the sitting health minister in Cabinet. The adoption of the sari is not exclusive to Sinhalese politicians; Muslim MP Ferial Ashraff combined a hijab with her sari while in Parliament.

Bangladesh

The sari is traditional dress for Bangladeshi women. 

There are many regional variations of saris in both silk and cotton. e.g., Dhakai Banarasi sari, Rajshahi silk, Tangail sari, Tant sari, Tassar silk sari, Manipuri sari and Katan sari. 

However, most working women choose to wear western clothes whilst Muslim Bangladeshi women opt for the shalwar kameez. 

The sari is reserved as the dress of choice for important occasions and events. 

In 2013, the traditional art of weaving jamdani was declared a UNESCO Intangible Cultural Heritage of Humanity.

In 2016, Bangladesh received geographical indication (GI) status for Jamdani sari.

Sri Lanka

Sri Lankan women wear saris in many styles. The Kandyan style is generally more popular in the hill country region of Kandy from which the style gets its name. Though local preferences play a role, most women decide on style depending on personal preference or what is perceived to be most flattering for their figure.

The traditional Kandyan (Osariya) style consists of a full blouse which covers the midriff completely and is partially tucked in at the front. However, the modern intermingling of styles has led to most wearers baring the midriff. The final tail of the sari is neatly pleated rather than free-flowing. This is rather similar to the pleated rosette used in the Pin Kosuvam style noted earlier in the article.

The Kandyan style is considered the national dress of Sinhalese women. It is the uniform of the air hostesses of SriLankan Airlines.

During the 1960s, the mini sari known as 'hipster' sari created a wrinkle in Sri Lankan fashion, since it was worn below the navel and barely above the line of prosecution for indecent exposure. The conservative people described the 'hipster' as "an absolute travesty of a beautiful costume almost a desecration" and "a hideous and purposeless garment".

Nepal
The sari is the most commonly worn women's clothing in Nepal where a special style of sari draping is called haku patasihh. The sari is draped around the waist and a shawl is worn covering the upper half of the sari, which is used in place of a pallu.

Pakistan

In Pakistan, some women wear saris on special occasions. Whilst the styling of the sari in Pakistan mimics the traditional Indian ways, Pakistani women wear fuller tops which do not bare the midriff or back in keeping with religious sensitivities.

Pakistani traditional dress, the Shalwar kameez is worn throughout the country on a daily basis.

Black Sari Day, is an celebration of Iqbal Bano a women who fought in a Black sari in Lahore against Zia. She sang Hum Dekhenge. Although this event is to bring family closer and to enjoy the day of Iqbal Bano.

Similarities with other Asian clothing
While the sari is typical to traditional wear for women in the Indian subcontinent, clothing worn by women in Southeast Asian countries like Myanmar, Malaysia, Indonesia, the Philippines, Cambodia, Thailand and Laos resemble it, where a long rectangular piece of cloth is draped around the body. Saris, worn predominantly in the Indian subcontinent are usually draped with one end of the cloth fastened around the waist, and the other end placed over the shoulder baring the midriff.

Ornamentation and decorative accessories

Saris are woven with one plain end (the end that is concealed inside the wrap), two long decorative borders running the length of the sari, and a one to three-foot section at the other end which continues and elaborates the length-wise decoration. This end is called the pallu; it is the part thrown over the shoulder in the nivi style of draping.

In past times, saris were woven of silk or cotton. The rich could afford finely woven, diaphanous silk saris that, according to folklore, could be passed through a finger ring. The poor wore coarsely woven cotton saris. All saris were handwoven and represented a considerable investment of time or money.

Simple hand-woven villagers' saris are often decorated with checks or stripes woven into the cloth. Inexpensive saris were also decorated with block printing using carved wooden blocks and vegetable dyes, or tie-dyeing, known in India as bhandani work.

More expensive saris had elaborate geometric, floral, or figurative ornaments or brocades created on the loom, as part of the fabric. Sometimes warp and weft threads were tie-dyed and then woven, creating ikat patterns. Sometimes threads of different colours were woven into the base fabric in patterns; an ornamented border, an elaborate pallu, and often, small repeated accents in the cloth itself. These accents are called buttis or bhuttis (spellings vary). For fancy saris, these patterns could be woven with gold or silver thread, which is called zari work.

Sometimes the saris were further decorated, after weaving, with various sorts of embroidery. Resham work is embroidery done with coloured silk thread. Zardozi embroidery uses gold and silver thread, and sometimes pearls and precious stones. Cheap modern versions of zardozi use synthetic metallic thread and imitation stones, such as fake pearls and Swarovski crystals.

In modern times, saris are increasingly woven on mechanical looms and made of artificial fibres, such as polyester, nylon, or rayon, which do not require starching or ironing. They are printed by machine, or woven in simple patterns made with floats across the back of the sari. This can create an elaborate appearance on the front, while looking ugly on the back. The punchra work is imitated with inexpensive machine-made tassel trim. Fashion designer Aaditya Sharma declared, "I can drape a sari in 54 different styles".

Hand-woven, hand-decorated saris are naturally much more expensive than the machine imitations. While the overall market for handweaving has plummeted (leading to much distress among Indian handweavers), hand-woven saris are still popular for weddings and other grand social occasions.

Saris outside the Indian subcontinent

The traditional sari made an impact in the United States during the 1970s. Eugene Novack who ran the New York store, Royal Sari House told that he had been selling it mainly to the Indian women in New York area but later many American business women and housewives became his customers who preferred their saris to resemble the full gown of the western world. He also said that men appeared intrigued by the fragility and the femininity it confers on the wearer. Newcomers to the sari report that it is comfortable to wear, requiring no girdles or stockings and that the flowing garb feels so feminine with unusual grace.

The sari has gained its popularity internationally because of the growth of Indian fashion trends globally. Many Bollywood celebrities, like Aishwarya Rai, have worn it at international events representing India's cultural heritage. In 2010, Bollywood actress Deepika Padukone wanted to represent her country at an international event, wearing the national costume. On her very first red carpet appearance at the Cannes International Film Festival, she stepped out on the red carpet in a Rohit Bal sari.

Many foreign celebrities have worn traditional sari attire designed by Indian fashion designers. American actress Pamela Anderson made a surprise guest appearance on Bigg Boss, the Indian version of Big Brother, dressed in a sari that was specially designed for her by Mumbai-based fashion designer Ashley Rebello. Ashley Judd donned a purple sari at the YouthAIDS Benefit Gala in November 2007 at the Ritz Carlton in Mclean, Virginia. There was an Indian flavour to the red carpet at the annual Fashion Rocks concert in New York, with designer Rocky S walking the ramp along with Jessica, Ashley, Nicole, Kimberly and Melody – the Pussycat Dolls – dressed in saris. in 2014, American singer Selena Gomez was seen in a sari for an UNICEF charity event at Nepal.

In the United States, the sari has recently become politicised with the digital-movement, "Sari, Not Sorry". Tanya Rawal-Jindia, a gender studies professor at UC Riverside, initiated this anti-xenophobia fashion-campaign on Instagram.

While an international image of the modern style sari may have been popularised by airline flight attendants, each region in the Indian subcontinent has developed, over the centuries, its own unique sari style. Following are other well-known varieties, distinct on the basis of fabric, weaving style, or motif, in the Indian subcontinent

Handloom and textiles
Handloom sari weaving is one of India's cottage industries. The handloom weaving process requires several stages in order to produce the final product. Traditionally the processes of dyeing (during the yarn, fabric, or garment stage), warping, sizing, attaching the warp, weft winding and weaving were done by weavers and local specialists around weaving towns and villages.

Northern and Central styles

 Banarasi – Uttar Pradesh
 Shalu – Uttar Pradesh
 Tanchoi – Uttar Pradesh
 Pattu - Himachal Pradesh
 Chanderi sari – Madhya Pradesh
 Maheshwari – Maheshwar, Madhya Pradesh
 Kosa silk – Chhattisgarh
 Dhokra silk – Madhya Pradesh

Eastern styles

 Tant sari  – throughout Bangladesh and West Bengal
 Baluchari sari – Bishnupur, West Bengal
 Kaantha sari – throughout Bengal
 Garode / Korial  – Murshidabad, West Bengal
 Shantipuri cotton  – Shantipur, Phulia, West Bengal
 Jamdani / Dhakai – Dhaka, Bangladesh
 Rajshahi silk / Eri – Rajshahi, Bangladesh
 Dhakai Katan  – Dhaka, Bangladesh
 Mooga silk – Assam
 Mekhla Cotton – Assam
 Sambalpuri Silk & Cotton sari – Sambalpur, Odisha
 Ikkat Silk & Cotton sari – Bargarh, Odisha

 Bomkai sari  – Bomkai, Ganjam, Odisha
 Khandua Silk & Cotton sari – Nuapatna, Cuttack, Odisha
 Pasapali sari  – Bargarh, Odisha
 Sonepuri Silk & Cotton sari – Subarnapur, Odisha
 Berhampuri silk – Behrampur, Odisha
 Mattha Silk sari – Mayurbhanj, Odisha
 Bapta Silk & Cotton sari – Koraput, Odisha
 Kotpad Pata sari – Koraput, Odisha
 Tanta Cotton sari – Balasore, Odisha
 Manipuri Tant sari  – Manipur
 Moirang Phi sari  – Manipur
 Patt Silk sari – Assam
 Kotki sari – Orissa
 Kotpad sari – Orissa

Western styles

Paithanpattu - Maharashtra
Yeola sari - Maharashtra
Peshwai shalu - Maharashtra
Mahalsa sari - Maharashtra
Narayanpeth - Maharashtra
Khun fabric - Maharashtra
Karvati tussar sari - Maharashtra

 Bandhani – Gujarat, Rajasthan, Pakistan, Sindh
 Kota doria – Rajasthan, Pakistan, Sindh
 Lugade – Maharashtra
 Patola – Gujarat
 Bagru – Rajasthan.
 Phulkari - Punjab.
 Ajrak - Sindh, Rajasthan, Gujarat

Southern styles

 Mysore silk  – Karnataka
 Kanchipuram Silk (locally called Kanjipuram pattu) – Tamil Nadu
 Arani silk - Tamil Nadu 
 Ilkal sari  – Karnataka
 Molakalmuru sari – Karnataka
 Sulebhavi sari  – Sulebhavi, Karnataka
 Venkatagiri – Andhra Pradesh
 Mangalagiri Silk saris  – Andhra Pradesh
 Uppada Silk saris – Andhra Pradesh
 Chirala saris – Andhra Pradesh
 Bandar saris  – Andhra Pradesh
 Bandarulanka  – Andhra Pradesh
 Kuppadam saris  – Andhra Pradesh
 Dharmavaram silk sari – Andhra Pradesh
 Chettinad saris – Tamil Nadu
 Kumbakonam – Tamil Nadu
 Thirubuvanam – Tamil Nadu
 Coimbatore cotton  – Tamil Nadu
 Salem silk – Tamil Nadu
 Chinnalampattu or Sungudi – Tamil Nadu
 Kandangi – Tamil Nadu
 Rasipuram silk saris – Tamil Nadu
 Koorai – Tamil Nadu
 Arni silk sari – Tamil Nadu
 Chennai – Tamil Nadu
 Karaikudi – Tamil Nadu
 Madurai cotton saris – Tamil Nadu
 Tiruchirappalli saris – Tamil Nadu
 Nagercoil saris – Tamil Nadu
 Thoothukudi – Tamil Nadu
 Thanjavur saris – Tamil Nadu
 Tiruppur – Tamil Nadu
 Kerala sari silk and cotton – Kerala
 Balarampuram – Kerala
 Mundum Neriyathum – Kerala
 Mayilati silk  – Kerala
 Kannur cotton  – Kerala
 Kalpathi silk saris – Kerala
 Maradaka silk – Kerala
 Samudrikapuram silk and cotton  – Kerala
 Kasargod – Kerala
 Pochampally sari or Puttapaka sari – Telangana
 Gadwal sari – Telangana
 Narayanpet – Telangana

Images

See also

 Ghagra choli
 Clothing in India
 Indian wedding clothes
 Lehenga-style sari
 Shalwar kameez
 Sari cancer
Dhoti

Notes

References

Bibliography
 Ambrose, Kay (1950) Classical Dances and Costumes of India. London: A. & C. Black.
 Craddock, Norma (1994) Anthills, Split Mothers, and Sacrifice: Conceptions of Female Power in the Mariyamman Tradition. Dissertation, University of California, Berkeley.

External links

 Sari vs. salwar kameez on the subcontinent
 Indian sari falls from grace as urban women adopt Western styles

 
Dresses
Indian clothing
Nepalese clothing
Bangladeshi clothing
Pakistani clothing
History of Asian clothing
History of fashion
Sri Lankan clothing